Tatana "Tana" Kellner (born 1950) is an American artist.

The daughter of Holocaust survivors, she was born in Czechoslovakia and came to Toledo, Ohio with her family in 1969. Kellner received a BA from the University of Toledo in 1972 and a MFA from the Rochester Institute of Technology in 1982. In 1974, she was one of the founders of the Women's Studio Workshop in Rosendale, New York with fellow artists Ann Kalmbach, Barbara Leoff Burge, and Anita Wetzel. She has served as artistic director for the workshop's residency program. She produces  limited-edition artist's books, as well as installation art and photography.

Kellner has received fellowships from the New York Foundation for the Arts, from the Center for Photography at Woodstock and the Empire State Crafts Alliance. She has received the Ruth & Harold Chenven Foundation Award and has been awarded residencies at the Visual Studies Workshop in Rochester, New York, the Artpark in Lewiston, New York and the MacDowell Colony in Peterborough, New Hampshire.

Her work is included in the collections of the Tate Library in London, the Toledo Museum of Art, the Metropolitan Museum of Art Library and the Museum of Modern Art Library. Her work is also in the collection of the New York Public Library, and the library of National Museum of Women in the Arts.

She frequently collaborates with her life partner Ann Kalmbach as Kakeart. Kellner has been named a "Papermaking Champion" by the North American Hand Papermakers

References 

1950 births
Living people
American women photographers
Women book artists
Book artists
Czechoslovak emigrants to the United States
University of Toledo alumni
Artists from Toledo, Ohio
Rochester Institute of Technology alumni
20th-century American women artists